Raise Your Fist and Yell is the tenth solo studio album by American rock musician Alice Cooper, released in October 1987, by MCA Records.  It features the track “Prince of Darkness”, which is featured very briefly in the John Carpenter film of the same name, in which Cooper has a cameo as a murderous vagrant. The song can be heard on the Walkman of one of his victims. A music video was made for the song "Freedom", which also became the album's sole single. Raise Your Fist and Yell is the only Alice Cooper album to feature Ken K. Mary on drums and the second and last to feature Kip Winger on bass.

The album continues the slasher film trend created by Cooper’s previous album Constrictor. The track “Lock Me Up” features a guest appearance from Robert Englund, who portrayed Freddy Krueger in the A Nightmare on Elm Street series.

The album cover for Raise Your Fist and Yell was painted by artist Jim Warren.

Tour
The infamous tour for the album, dubbed “Live in the Flesh,” was notorious in Europe in 1988 for its graphic violence and theatricality. The show included many of Cooper’s old favourites, such as the gallows (for the first time since 1972), but offered new theatrics such as impaling a person with a bike (this was also seen in John Carpenter's Prince of Darkness, used by Cooper in a cameo role as a vagrant killing one of the characters). Most of the tour's more violent acts were heavily inspired by the horror movies of the time, by including graphic onstage deaths and large amounts of stage blood. Cooper has been said to be a big fan of these movies.

The show was seen to be so violent that the German government forced Cooper to remove some of the more graphic parts of the show. A (blind) Member of Parliament in the UK, David Blunkett, appealed to have the show banned altogether from the country, but his attempt was unsuccessful.

Live performances
Five songs from Raise Your Fist and Yell were played by Cooper during the album’s supporting tour: "Freedom", "Prince of Darkness", "Chop Chop Chop", "Gail" and "Roses on White Lace". Until “Roses on White Lace” was revived as a regular part of setlists for the 2019 “Ol’ Black Eyes Is Back” tour, nothing from Raise Your Fist and Yell was ever performed by Cooper subsequent to the close of the “Live in the Flesh” tour.

Track listing

Personnel
Alice Cooper - vocals
Kane Roberts - guitar, backing vocals 
Kip Winger - bass, backing vocals, keyboards on “Gail”
Paul Taylor - keyboards
Ken K. Mary - drums

Additional Personnel
Robert Englund - Freddy Krueger on "Lock Me Up"

Charts

References

1987 albums
Alice Cooper albums
MCA Records albums
Albums produced by Michael Wagener
Glam metal albums